Estanislao Artal (5 September 1912 – September 1967) was a Spanish swimmer. He competed in the men's 4 × 200 metre freestyle relay event at the 1928 Summer Olympics.

References

External links
 

1912 births
1967 deaths
Spanish male freestyle swimmers
Olympic swimmers of Spain
Swimmers at the 1928 Summer Olympics
Swimmers from Barcelona